Sebastian Karlsson Grach (born 6 May 2001) is a Swedish football midfielder who currently plays for Östersund.

References

2001 births
Living people
Swedish footballers
Association football midfielders
Östersunds FK players
Allsvenskan players
Superettan players